The 1969–70 Mexican Segunda División was the 20th season of the Mexican Segunda División. The season started on 10 July 1969 and concluded on 1 March 1970. It was won by Zacatepec.

Changes 
 Torreón was promoted to Primera División.
 Nuevo León was relegated from Primera División.
 Texcoco was relegated from Segunda División.
 Naucalpan was promoted from Tercera División.

Teams

League table

Results

References 

1969–70 in Mexican football
Segunda División de México seasons